The women's 1500 metres in short track speed skating at the 2006 Winter Olympics took place on 18 February at the Torino Palavela.

Records
Prior to this competition, the existing world and Olympic records were as follows:

No new world and Olympic records were set during this competition.

Results

Heats
There were six heats of four or five skaters each, with the top three finishers advancing to the semifinals.

Semifinals
The top two finishers in each of the three semifinals qualified for the A final, while the third and fourth place skaters advanced to the B Final.
Tatiana Borodulina finished fifth in her semifinal, but was advanced due to interference from Stéphanie Bouvier.

Semifinal 1

Semifinal 2

Semifinal 3

Finals
The largest short-track race of the Games, with seven women entered, saw two of the skaters disqualified. The most notable of these was Byun Chun-sa, who originally finished third. She was adjudged to have interfered with Wang Meng. Wang, who was originally fourth, moved into the bronze medal position after Byun's disqualification.

Final A

Final B

References

Women's short track speed skating at the 2006 Winter Olympics